Elk Grove Charter School is a charter school located in Elk Grove, California, United States. It is officially accredited by the Western Association of Schools and Colleges (WASC).  The school serves students in the 7th-12th grades in the Elk Grove Unified School District and five counties that touch Sacramento County.

References

External links
Official Website

High schools in Sacramento County, California
Charter preparatory schools in California
Elk Grove, California
1999 establishments in California
Educational institutions established in 1999